Christopher Sutton (born 10 September 1984) is an Australian former professional cyclist from Australia, who rode professionally between 2005 and 2015 for the ,  and  squads.

Born in Caringbah, Sydney, New South Wales, Sutton trained as a carpenter. He is the son of NSW Institute of Sport's head cycling coach, Gary Sutton, and nephew of British Cycling track coach, Shane Sutton; both ex-professional cyclists. He began cycling at the age of 11,  and turned professional in 2005, riding the UCI ProTour for the  team. In 2010 he moved to the newly formed Team Sky, departing at the end of the 2015 season. He lives in Sylvania, New South Wales.

Major results

2003
 1st Stage 5 Bay Classic Series
2004
 1st  Points race, National Track Championships
2005
 1st  Road race, National Under-23 Road Championships
 1st  Madison, National Track Championships
 1st Gran Premio della Liberazione
 1st Coppa G. Romita
 5th Road race, UCI Under-23 Road World Championships
2006
 1st Cholet-Pays de Loire
2007
 1st Châteauroux Classic
 1st Stage 4 Circuit Cycliste Sarthe
 1st Stage 1 Tour du Poitou-Charentes
2008
 1st  Overall Delta Tour Zeeland
 1st Stage 1 (TTT) Giro d'Italia
 4th Overall Tour of Qatar
2009
 2nd Overall Herald Sun Tour
1st Stages 2, 3 & 4
 2nd Overall Tour of Britain
1st Stage 1
2010
 1st  Overall Bay Classic Series
 1st Stage 3 Brixia Tour
 1st Stage 6 Tour Down Under
 2nd Down Under Classic
 4th Road race, Commonwealth Games
2011
 1st Kuurne–Brussels–Kuurne
 1st Stage 2 Vuelta a España
 3rd Overall Tour de Wallonie-Picarde
1st Stage 2
 10th Paris–Bourges
2013
 9th Le Samyn
 9th RideLondon–Surrey Classic
2014
 1st Japan Cup Criterium 
 4th Down Under Classic
2015
 4th Down Under Classic

References

External links

 

 

1984 births
Sportsmen from New South Wales
Cyclists from Sydney
Australian male cyclists
Australian Vuelta a España stage winners
Living people
New South Wales Institute of Sport alumni
Cyclists at the 2010 Commonwealth Games
Commonwealth Games competitors for Australia